William Frye Garcelon Jr. (October 24, 1868 – July 4, 1949) was an American politician, lawyers, college football player, track and field athlete, and coach. He served as the head football coach at Bates College from 1894 to 1895. Garcelon was a member of the Massachusetts House of Representatives in 1907 and 1908.

Garcelon was born October 24, 1868, in Lewiston, Maine. He attended Bates College, where he played football and baseball and was a member of the track team. In 1893 and 1894, he played football at left halfback for the Boston Athletic Association (BAA). He graduated from Harvard Law School in 1895. Garcelon coached track at Harvard in 1904 was the graduate manager of the Harvard Athletic Association from 1908 to 1913. Around the same time, he was an athletics instructor at Roxbury Latin School in Boston and coached the track team at Portland High School in Portland, Maine. In 1933, Garcelon was elected president of the Boston Garden and became the head of the BAA in 1934. He died on July 4, 1949, at his home in Beverly, Massachusetts.

References

1868 births
1949 deaths
19th-century players of American football
American football halfbacks
Bates Bobcats baseball players
Bates Bobcats football coaches
Bates Bobcats football players
Bates Bobcats men's track and field athletes
Boston Athletic Association
Boston Garden
Harvard Crimson men's track and field athletes
Harvard Crimson track and field coaches
College track and field coaches in the United States
High school track and field coaches in the United States
Harvard Law School alumni
Members of the Massachusetts House of Representatives
Sportspeople from Lewiston, Maine
Coaches of American football from Maine
Players of American football from Maine
Baseball players from Maine
Track and field athletes from Maine